Klaus Behrens (3 August 1941 – 19 September 2022) was a German rower who was most successful in the eights. In this event he won a silver medal at the 1964 Summer Olympics, a world title in 1962, and three European titles in 1963–1965.

References

External links

1941 births
2022 deaths
People from Ratzeburg
People from the Province of Schleswig-Holstein
West German male rowers
Sportspeople from Schleswig-Holstein
Olympic rowers of the United Team of Germany
Rowers at the 1964 Summer Olympics
Olympic silver medalists for the United Team of Germany
Olympic medalists in rowing
World Rowing Championships medalists for West Germany
Medalists at the 1964 Summer Olympics
Recipients of the Silver Laurel Leaf
European Rowing Championships medalists